Ferrette is a commune in the Haut-Rhin department in Alsace in north-eastern France.

It is situated close to the Swiss border. Its main attraction is the Château de Ferrette.

County of Ferrette

The County of Ferrette came into existence in the 11th century and consisted of a large part of southern Alsace. In 1324, the County was acquired by Austria through the marriage of Jeanne, Countess of Ferrette, with Albert II, Duke of Austria. The County was part of the dowry for Catherine of Burgundy upon her marriage to Duke Leopold IV. Upon Leopold's death in 1411, his brother, Frederick occupied Ferrette. Austria ceded it to France in the Peace of Westphalia of 1648.

See also
 Communes of the Haut-Rhin département

References

Communes of Haut-Rhin
History of Alsace